ATR: All Terrain Racing is a racing game published by Team17 for Amiga and Amiga CD32 on May 8, 1995. During a protracted dispute between Team17 and Amiga Power, the magazine's reviewer, Jonathan Nash, awarded ATR: All Terrain Racing a rating of 38%, prompting the developer to pursue a lawsuit for defamation.

Gameplay

ATR: All Terrain Racing is a top-down racer. Gameplay was designed to focused on drifting around corners and crashing into opponents.

Unlike its contemporaries of the same genre, tracks in ATR were designed with shortcuts. Tracks also contain environmental hazards the player has to avoid, such as oil slicks and small jumps as well as pick-ups such as turbos. Tracks have turns that are not just 90 degrees in nature, a feature not present in Overdrive, ATR's predecessor.

Notes

References

External links
Team17
ATR: All Terrain Racing at Amiga Hall of Light
ATR: All Terrain Racing at Lemon Amiga
ATR: All Terrain Racing - Amiga Reviews

1995 video games
Amiga games
Amiga CD32 games
Racing video games
Team17 games
Multiplayer and single-player video games
Video games developed in the United Kingdom
Video games scored by Allister Brimble
Amiga-only games